Women's professional sports are a relatively new phenomenon, having largely emerged within the latter part of the 20th century. Unlike amateur women athletes, professional women athletes are able to acquire an income which allows them to earn a living without requiring another source of income. In international terms, most top female athletes are not paid and work full-time or part-time jobs in addition to their training, practice, and competition schedules. Professional organizations for women in sport are most common in developed countries where there are investors available to buy teams and businesses which can afford to sponsor them in exchange for publicity and the opportunity to promote a variety of their products. Very few governments support professional sports, male or female. Today there are a number of professional women's sport leagues in the United States and Canada.

History

From the 1800s, in Western Europe and some other countries, women's physiology was described as delicate or weaker compared to men, and whose purpose, drive, and energy should solely be directed towards bearing and raising children. Medical rationalities of the time presented concerns on the effects of what may happen to a female's reproductive system and functionality if women were to participate in sports. “Violent movements of the body can cause a shift in the position and a loosening of the uterus as well as prolapse and bleeding, with resulting sterility, thus defeating a woman’s true purpose in life, i.e., the bringing forth of strong children.” The theory of frailty communicates women to naturally be weak and frail in comparison to men. However, if women were to hold any means of power or strength, it is only through having the energy to draw on in a crisis from motherhood instincts to protect their children.

Aesthetic rationalities were driven by the prospect that attractive and pretty girls could not participle in sports because that would diminish their desirable qualities. Though some would argue that “unattractive girls are comparatively good sports. Pretty girls are not. The ugly ducklings have taken to sport as an escape and to compensate for whatever it is they lack, sex appeal, charm, ready-made beauty.” The aesthetic commentary on women in professional fields of sports dealt with concern that participation made women unattractive. With the act of viewing female athletes in professional competitions was damaging to your eyes. Pierre de Coubertin, a founder of the International Olympic Committee, conveys in witnessing a female Olympic participant of the winter sport bob-sleighing, “Seeing a lady with her skirts lifted sliding in this position, usually scratching up the runway with two small pointed sticks which she holds in her hands and which help her to steer the sleigh, that sight represents a true offense to the eyes. Nothing uglier could be imagined.” The involvement of females within the Olympic Games started in the 1982 Games, where three hundred women competed. Since then, female participation has gradually grown, with the number of female participants in 1988 Seoul Games having female participants make up one-fourth of the athletes.  

The social presentation that kept women from involving themselves in professional sports was from the fear that women's participation in professional sports would threaten the male depiction and ideals of sports. In 1902, the United States Lawn Tennis Association changed women's five sets matches, which the male athletes play presently, to the best of three sets format. This decision was dictated by the unsettlement of the rigorous work that women could not keep up with in accordance to the men's games.

Beginning in the late 1960s, a few women gained enough recognition for their athletic talent and social acceptance as role models to earn a living playing sports. Most of these were in the United States. Among them was Joan Weston, a roller derby star who was once the highest-paid female in sports, but she was the exception rather than the rule.

Things began to change in 1973 when Billie Jean King won "the Battle of the Sexes" and cracked the glass ceiling on pay for female athletes. Other players, like Martina Navratilova, broke through that ceiling as well, decreasing the gap between women and men athletes' pay on a regular basis rather than occasionally.

Even now, in the 21st century, most professional women's athletes around the world receive very little notoriety or pay compared to men.  Life acknowledged the importance of King's achievement in 1990 by naming her one of the "100 Most Important Americans of the 20th Century."

Associations
United Women's Sports LLC (UWS) is a professional sports company founded in 2016 in Providence, Rhode Island, United States. Operating women's professional sports leagues as a financially sustainable sports entertainment product, UWS works toward raising awareness of women in sports. Part of its mission also includes providing opportunities for women to work in sports, including disciplines such as marketing, on-air, production, operations, and finance.

Founded by Digit Murphy, she serves as Chief Executive Officer, while Aronda Kirby, a former General Manager with the Boston Blades, holds the title of Chief Operations Officer. Their first venture involved lacrosse, with the launch of UWLX taking place in the summer of 2016. In the aftermath of the inaugural season, the Long Island Sound emerged as league champions.

In addition to the UWLX, Murphy and Kirby are both co-founders of the Play It Forward Sports Foundation, with the goal of advancing gender equity in sports at all levels of play. With the objective of providing more opportunities for women in sports as professional athletes, coaches, and managers, the model for Play It Forward Sports also allows female athletes a chance to participate in the community by educating, training, and mentoring young female athletes, providing them with earning potential.

Athlete ambassadors for Play It Forward include Molly Schaus, along with tennis players Neha Uberoi and Shikha Uberoi. In addition, Schaus is part of the Foundation's Board, which includes Valarie Gelb, Debbie Mckay, and John Mayers.

United States

Though women have been pro athletes in the United States since the early 1900s, paid teams and leagues are still uncommon and, as of 2013, female athletes are paid far less than their male counterparts. For instance, the  WNBA had its first season in 1997, 51 years after the inception of the men's NBA. The WNBA (under the NBA Board of Governors) pays the top women's players less than 1% of the salary that the top men's players are capable of earning; in 2021, the maximum salary for any WNBA player was $221,450, while the maximum NBA salary was $38,199,000. In 2005, the WNBA team salary cap was $0.673 million; by 2021, this amount had nearly doubled to $1.339 million. However, during this period, the NBA's cap more than doubled, from $43.87 million in 2005 to $109.14 million in 2021.

The Women's United Soccer Association became the first American women's pro league in 2001, but lasted only briefly because of financial sponsorship. Fans enjoyed women's pro soccer for three seasons before executives  announced the suspension of the league, despite the women's national soccer team (USWNT) rating  it as one of the world's top teams. The absence of a Women's professional football (soccer) league in the United States made it difficult for the USWNT to find new players until Women's Professional Soccer was founded. A 2004 effort to revive the WUSA  was launched. On September 4, 2007, a new North American women's professional football league, tentatively named Women's Soccer LLC, was announced, and ultimately launched in 2009 as Women's Professional Soccer. That league folded after its 2012 season, with the current National Women's Soccer League established later that year and beginning play in 2013.

Soccer
The Women's Professional Soccer league, formed in September 2007, began its league play in March 2009. In its final season in 2011, there were six teams in the eastern United States. The WPS canceled the 2012 season when the number of teams dropped to five after Dan Borislow's team in South Florida magicJack was terminated by the league. The WPS hoped to continue the season in 2013 with at least six teams and eight in the 2014 season, but ultimately folded in May 2012 because of legal and financial troubles.

In November 2012, the US, Mexican, and Canadian soccer federations announced the establishment of the National Women's Soccer League, which began to play in 2013. The US and Canadian federations remain involved with the NWSL; the Mexican federation withdrew after establishing Liga MX Femenil in 2016.

The National Women's Soccer team saw the loss of the Boston Breakers in January 2018. The Boston Breakers were one of the earliest women's professional teams starting in 2000 under the Women's United Soccer Association. Despite continuing to switch leagues throughout the years, the Boston Breakers continued to find funding for the team. When the team folded in 2018 due to a lack of funding, the league held a draft for the players on the Boston Breakers.

Baseball

With the entry of the United States into World War II, several major league baseball executives started a new professional league with women players in order to maintain baseball in the public eye while the majority of able men were away. The founders included Philip K. Wrigley, Branch Rickey, and Paul V. Harper. They feared that Major League Baseball might even temporarily cease due to the war because of the loss of talent, as well as restrictions on team travel due to gasoline rationing.

Since many men were on the battlefield during the Second World War, the All-American Girls Professional Baseball League (AAGPBL), in place of Major League Baseball, was created in 1943 to provide entertainment for people exhausted by the war. It was such a success that the number of people who attended women's baseball games reached almost 1 million in 1948. Yet, when the war ended and Major League Baseball players came back home, female baseball players were obliged to fill the role of a housewife at home. AAGPBL lost its audience, struggled with finances, and ceased to exist in 1954. The National Girls Baseball League operated in the same era (1944-1954), drawing 500,000 in some seasons.

Forty years later, in 1994, a businessman in Atlanta struck a $3 million sponsorship deal with Coors and formed a women's professional baseball team called the Colorado Silver Bullets. About 20 members were selected from 1,300 baseball players nationwide for the team. The Bullets played games with both men's semiprofessional teams and regional teams. After the birth of the Ladies League Baseball in 1997, it included four teams. The Bullets fought with them. 

The Ladies League Baseball changed its name to the Ladies Pro Baseball and added two teams into the league in 1998. However, after the first month, the league was suspended due to the financial difficulties of its sponsors. The Bullets folded in 1998 after Coors terminated its contract.

Basketball
There are many countries where women's professional basketball leagues exist besides the United States, such as Italy, Germany, Spain, and Brazil. Many American players went overseas, and some WNBA  players play basketball in foreign countries during WNBA's off-season.

The Women's Professional Basketball League (WBL) was a professional women's basketball league in the United States. The league played three seasons from the fall of 1978 to the spring of 1981. The league is generally considered to be the first American professional women's basketball league to be founded. The next league was the Women's American Basketball Association and the Women's Basketball Association (WBA)  The WABA/WBA was a professional women's basketball league in the United States. The league played three seasons from the summer of 1993 to the summer of 1995. The league is considered to be the first American professional women's basketball league to be successful as a summer league, like the WNBA. Also, the American Basketball League (ABL) was founded in 1996 during an increase in interest in the sport following the 1996 Summer Olympics. The league played two full seasons (1996–97 and 1997–98) and started a third (1998–99) before it folded on December 22, 1998.

Golf

The LPGA (Ladies Professional Golf Association) was founded in 1950 and is the longest-running women's professional sports association.

Horse racing
In 1906 Lula Olive Gill became the first female jockey to win a horse race in California. Later that same year, Ada Evans Dean rode her own horse to victory after her jockey had become ill. Indeed, Dean won twice — in spite of never having raced before.

Kathy Kusner mounted a successful legal case in 1968 to become the first licensed female jockey in the United States. Since the age of 16, she had been regularly winning unrecognized flat and timber races. As a licensed jockey, she rode races up and down the eastern seaboard and Canada and became the first licensed female jockey to ride races in Mexico, Germany, Colombia, Chile, Peru, Panama, South Africa, and what was then Rhodesia. She was also the first woman to ride in the Maryland Hunt Cup, widely considered the toughest timber race in the world. ABC Television filmed an award-winning documentary in Saratoga about Kusner being the first woman in modern times to ride in a steeplechase at the racetrack.

Ice hockey
The National Women's Hockey League (NWHL), now called the Premier Hockey Federation (PHF), is a women's professional ice hockey league in the United States. The league was established in 2015 with four teams. The league has since grown to seven teams: the Boston Pride, Buffalo Beauts, Connecticut Whale, Metropolitan Riveters, Minnesota Whitecaps, and two Canadian teams, the Montreal Force and Toronto Six. The league debuted as the first women's professional ice hockey league to pay its players.

Lacrosse
The United Women's Lacrosse League is a professional Women's lacrosse league in the United States that was co-founded in Boston, Massachusetts by Digit Murphy and Aronda Kirby of the Play It Forward Sports Foundation in a strategic partnership with STX. Penn State alum and former United States national team player Michele DeJuliis was appointed as the league's commissioner.
 
The inaugural season saw four teams with rosters hailing from Baltimore, Boston, Long Island, and Philadelphia. The names of the founding four clubs are the Baltimore Ride, Boston Storm, Long Island Sound and Philadelphia Force. Regular season play was scheduled to start on May 28, 2016, as a draft took place on April 13 to fill the four-team rosters. In the inaugural draft, Maryland Terrapins alumnus and former US national team player Katie Schwarzmann would be the first-ever player selected, taken by the Baltimore Ride with the top pick. The inaugural regular-season champions were the Long Island Sound, while Dana Dobbie captured the regular-season scoring title.

Softball

The first women's professional softball league was established in 1976, but it only lasted for four years because of its financial reasons and failure in marketing. In 1994, the  National Pro Fastpitch emerged to prepare a rebirth of the professional league, which came into existence with 6 teams in 1997. As of 2012, the league has 4 teams that play 44 games each and then participate in the Championship Series. The league is expected to expand "due to ongoing expansion efforts".

Tennis

The Women's Tennis Association (WTA) was founded in 1973 with Billie Jean King at the forefront. It is widely considered the most (financially) successful organization in all of women's professional sports.  The WTA has over 2,500 players from 92 nations, and it has over $100 million in prize money for 54 tournaments and 4 Grand Slams in 33 countries.

The United States has hosted the US Open, one of four annual major tennis tournaments, since 1887. Many tennis tournaments, including the US Open, allow women to play individually (singles), and on teams of two (two women: doubles; one woman and one man: mixed doubles).

Notably successful American female tennis players include Elizabeth Ryan, Molla Bjurstedt Mallory, Helen Wills Moody, Louise Brough Clapp, Margaret Osborne DuPont, Doris Hart, Maureen Connolly, Althea Gibson, Billie Jean King, Chris Evert, Martina Navratilova, Pam Shriver, Gigi Fernández, Venus Williams, and Serena Williams.

Notably successful active American female tennis players include Venus Williams, Serena Williams, Bethanie Mattek-Sands, Sloane Stephens, and Sofia Kenin.

Chris Evert, Martina Navratilova, and Serena Williams are considered, with other non-Americans such as Margaret Court and Steffi Graf, the best female tennis players of all time.

Volleyball & beach volleyball

The Women's Professional Volleyball Association was established in 1986. The association organized professional 6-player indoor volleyball leagues and beach volleyball leagues, such as Budlight Pro Beach Volleyball League in 1997, in which 4 teams participated. It dissolved in 1997.Major League Volleyball, a professional league, operated from 1987 to 1989.

Motorsports

Motorsports organizations allow men and women to compete on an equal footing.

Eight women qualified to the Indianapolis 500 formula race: Janet Guthrie (9th in 1978), Lyn St. James (11th in 1992), Sarah Fisher, Danica Patrick (3rd in 2009 and 4th in 2005), Simona de Silvestro, Pippa Mann, Milka Duno and Ana Beatriz Figueiredo. They also raced at American open wheel racing (USAC National Championship, Champ Car and IndyCar Series). The only one to win a race was Patrick at the 2008 Indy Japan 300; she scored several podiums and finished 5th in the 2009 IndyCar Series season, 6th in 2008, and 7th in 2007. Guthrie finished 5th in a USAC race in 1979. Fisher scored two podiums.

The most successful NASCAR female drivers were Sara Christian, who finished 5th in a Cup Series race in 1949; Guthrie, who finished 6th in a 1977 round; and Patrick, who finished 4th in an Xfinity Series race.

In drag racing, Shirley Shahan was the first woman to win an NHRA national race, the 1966 Winternationals in the Top Stock class. Shirley Muldowney was the first female drag racer to compete in Top Fuel, the main class of the National Hot Rod Association, and won the 1977, 1980, and 1982 championships. Angelle Sampey won three consecutive Pro Stock Motorcycle titles from 2000 to 2002. Three of the daughters of drag racing legend John Force—Ashley, Brittany, and Courtney—followed in their father's footsteps as drivers. All three won multiple top-level NHRA events, Ashley and Courtney in Funny Car and Brittany in Top Fuel, and Brittany won the Top Fuel title in 2017 and 2022. Erica Enders-Stevens has won won five season championships in Pro Stock, most recently in 2022..

Milka Duno scored three overall wins at the Rolex Sports Car Series.

Patrick has been receiving substantial mass media coverage since her first IndyCar season, starring in advertising campaigns in the United States and earning among the top 10 sportswomen.

Australia
Throughout the late 1800s and until the twentieth century, women were only allowed to swim. When swimming, they had to wear oversized bathing suits to protect themselves from being seen by men. It was not until the 1920s and 1930s when women wore more fitting bathing suits. In the 1900s, more teams started to emerge for women. A majority of the groups were lawn bowls and golf clubs, but in the 1930s, athletic clubs were created such as track and field. In the 1970s and so forth, gender specific sports teams had been created. 

In Australia, the Australian Institute of Sport has started many programs to help women's golf.

The ANZ Championship launched in 2008 with 10 teams (five from Australia and five from New Zealand). The ANZ Championship was the first professional netball competition in Australasia and the world's best netball league until Australia's national federation pulled out of the league after its 2016 season. Today, Australia's top league is Suncorp Super Netball and New Zealand's is the ANZ Premiership.

Also in 2017, the Australian Football League launched AFL Women's, a semi-professional competition in Australian rules football, with all sides operated by existing AFL men's clubs. In addition to AFL Women's, two other associations, Cricket Australia and Australian Cricketer's Association, were made and were able to provide all Australian cricketers equal pay, no matter their gender.

Tennis
Australia has hosted one of four annual major tennis tournaments, the Australian Open, since 1922.

Notably successful Australian female tennis players include: Margaret Court, Evonne Goolagong Cawley, Nancye Wynne Bolton, Thelma Coyne Long, Judy Tegart-Dalton, Daphne Akhurst, and Ashleigh Barty.

Notably successful active Australian female tennis players include Samantha Stosur.

Cricket
Figures released by the International Cricket Council reveal that the ICC Women's T20 World Cup 2020 hosted by Australia was one of the most watched women's sporting events in history.

The event held a global audience of 89 million, which is 131% increase to the ICC Women's World T20 2018.

The final match between Indian national women's cricket team and Australia set a record attendance ( 86,174 ) for a Women's sports match in Australia and second highest globally.

Sweden

Football
In the early twentieth century, the first ever women's football team was created in Sweden. About a year later, in Stockholm, the first match between two female-only teams took place. Between the years of 1910 and 1920, women played against 'gubblag', or old-boy sides, and any money the match made went back to the facility they were using or to charities. Also, in the span of those 10 years, society worked hard to make sure women's football was taken more seriously and that more matches were planned between women's teams. Soon after, a women's football league was created in Umeå, a coastal city in the northern part of Sweden.

Established in 1966, Öxabäck IF women's football team was the first team that worked hard to create all women football teams and to receive recognition as the first 'modern' women's football team. Two years later, women started to receive recognition in other sports in Sweden.

Canada

A number of professional sports opportunities for women athletes exist in Canada in both individual and team sports. For a time, Canada had a professional women's ice hockey league called the Canadian Women's Hockey League (CWHL), but the league collapsed in 2019. In the late 2010s, increasing interest in women's soccer resulted in calls to consider the creation of a professional women’s soccer league.

Ice hockey
The first organized women's ice hockey leagues started in Canada, as did the first-ever attempt at launching a women's professional league in the 1990s. The Canadian Women's Hockey League (CWHL) had a relatively long period of existence with the last incarnation of the league beginning operations in 2007 then collapsing in 2019. The CWHL had many names: In the late 90s and early 2000s, it was the National Women's Hockey League (NWHL). Many of the CWHL's early players were culled from the NWHL after its demise in 2007. At the time, owners were losing money and unable to forge a cohesive plan for how to move the league forward. The prospect of not having a professional league for women left the world's top players with nowhere to play.

In the summer of 2007, a new initiative launched a player-run league. Along with players Kathleen Kauth,  Kim McCullough,  Sami Jo Small,  Jennifer Botterill,  Lisa-Marie Breton and a group of business people, they formed the Canadian Women's Hockey League (CWHL), following the example of the National Lacrosse League. The result was a non-profit organization that favoured a centralized league over the old ownership model. The new league would cover all basic travel, ice rental, uniforms and equipment costs for the league's 6 teams across Eastern Canada. Until the 2010-11 season, the players in the league had to pay over $1,000 each to play ice hockey. While these elite female hockey players hoped to make a living exclusively from playing someday, everyone involved in the CWHL from players to staff worked “pro bono,” and worked regular jobs and careers, some of whom were National Team athletes.

The entire CWHL collapsed in 2019, with the league stating that the cause was an unsustainable business model.

Tennis
Canadian professional tennis player Bianca Andreescu won the 2019 US Open.

Denmark

In Denmark, women were allowed to participate in football in a football club or in school. In 1959, the manager of a sports club, Allan Andersen, noticed that many of the women's sports activities were not receiving the funding needed. Allan Andersen saw student nurses at a nearby hospital playing handball and invited them to play football during halftime. A journalist from Femina went to cover the match, and not long after, the magazine was in a general meeting with those women establishing an association for women's football. A year later, Femina stopped providing financial support to the association. The women created their own union, Dansk Kvindelig Fodbold Union (the Danish Women's Football Union, or DKFU). DKFU was responsible for coordinating tournaments and establishing the rules, until the association was included in the DBU.

The Danish women's team handball league, Damehåndboldligaen, is all-pro and internationally considered the strongest and most well paid in the world. Leading clubs are GOG, Slagelse, Aalborg DH and Viborg HK.

The Danish women's football league, Elitedivisionen is semi-professional. Leading clubs are Fortuna Hjorring and HEI.

Retired Danish professional tennis player Caroline Wozniacki was the number one female singles' tennis player in the world for 71 weeks (9th all-time) and won the 2018 Australian Open.

England

Association Football
In England, the top competition of women's football, the FA Women's Super League, is professional, as of the 2018-19 season. The major women's clubs competing are affiliates of male club counterparts, usually bearing the same names with the acronyms LFC or WFC, but they do not share the same large stadiums, instead renting smaller stadiums from lower-level clubs (no women's club actually owns their stadium). The competition is semi-professional, meaning that the players are paid above the old maximum for professionals but rely on part-time jobs or schooling outside the game. Full professionalism has been tried, mostly on the part of individual teams (Fulham L.F.C. was the first side to go full pro, but was downgraded later by the owners), but it will take years to develop a fully professionalized women's league in England. Backing by a male club does not necessarily equal success, and the level of success achieved by male clubs may be reversed in female counterparts (compare these local derbies: Aston Villa vs. Birmingham City; Bristol City vs. Bristol Rovers; Liverpool vs. Everton; and Sunderland vs. Newcastle United).

Others
Similar semi-professionalism examples exist in women's rugby union and cricket. Common to most Europe sports, promotion and relegation is used in the leagues (a model not used by either the WNBA or NWSL). The Ladies European Tour is Europe's leading women's professional golf tour and formed as the WPGA in 1978. Over the last 33 years, the tour has developed into a truly international organization, and in 2011 operated 28 golf tournaments in 19 different countries worldwide.

England has hosted Wimbledon, one of four annual major tennis tournaments, since 1884. Notably successful female English tennis players include: Dorothea Lambert Chambers, Blanche Bingley Hillyard, Lottie Dod, Charlotte Cooper Sterry,  Phoebe Holcroft Watson, Ann Haydon-Jones, and Virginia Wade. The most notably successful active English female tennis player is Emma Raducanu.

France
France has hosted the French Open, one of four annual major tennis tournaments, since 1897.

Notably successful female French tennis players include: Suzanne Lenglen, Simonne Mathieu, Françoise Dürr, Gail Chanfreau, Mary Pierce, Amélie Mauresmo, Marion Bartoli, and Kristina Mladenovic.

Notably successful active female French tennis players include: Caroline Garcia and Kristina Mladenovic.

Eastern Europe

Tennis

Belarus
Notably successful Belarusian female tennis players include: Natasha Zvereva (represented the Soviet Union, and later Belarus), Victoria Azarenka, and Aryna Sabalenka. Azarenka and Sabalenka are still active.

Croatia
Notably successful Croatian female tennis players include: Mirjana Lucic-Baroni and Iva Majoli.

Czech Republic
Notably successful Czech female tennis players include: Martina Navratilova (represented Czechoslovakia for first win, subsequently represented the United States after being stripped of citizenship), Helena Sukova (represented Czechoslovakia and later the Czech Republic), Jana Novotná (represented Czechoslovakia and later the Czech Republic), Hana Mandlíková (Czech-born, represented Czechoslovakia and later Australia), Andrea Hlaváčková (represented Czech Republic), Lucie Hradecká (represented Czech Republic), Lucie Safarova (represented Czech Republic), and Petra Kvitová (represented Czech Republic).

Notably successful active Czech female tennis players include: Barbora Strycova, Barbora Krejčíková, Katerina Siniakova, Petra Kvitová, and Karolina Pliskova.

Hungary
Notably successful Hungarian female tennis players include: Zsuzsa Körmöczy (represented Hungary), Andrea Temesvári (represented Hungary), and Monica Seles (ethnically Hungarian, represented Yugoslavia and later the United States).

Latvia
Notably successful Latvian female tennis players include: Larisa Savchenko-Neiland (represented the Soviet Union, Ukraine, and Latvia) and Jelena Ostapenko. Ostapenko is still active.

Poland
Notably successful Polish female tennis players include the retired Jadwiga Jędrzejowska and Agnieszka Radwańska as well as the currently active Iga Świątek.

Romania
Notably successful Romanian female tennis players include: Virginia Ruzici and Simona Halep. Halep is still active.

Russia
Notably successful Russian female tennis players include: Anna Kournikova, Svetlana Kuznetsova, Vera Zvonareva, Elena Vesnina, Ekaterina Makarova, Yaroslava Shvedova (represented Kazakhstan, not Russia), and Maria Sharapova.

Serbia
Notably successful Serbian female tennis players include: Ana Ivanovic and Jelena Jankovic.

Slovenia
Notably successful Slovenian female tennis players include: Mima Jaušovec (represented Yugoslavia) and Katarina Srebotnik.

Ukraine
Notably successful Ukrainian female tennis players include: Alona Bondarenko and Kateryna Bondarenko.

Latin America

Association football

Women's football in Latin America is overseen by two organizations. South America is mostly overseen by the South American Football Association, or CONMEBOL, while Mexico, Central America, and the Spanish-speaking Caribbean are overseen by CONCACAF. Both organizations have categories for male and female players. CONMEBOL also organizes the Copa Libertadores Femenina competition for club teams, while CONCACAF currently has no women's club competition. The men's Copa Libertadores was founded in 1959, and the women's competition in 2009. The 2018 competition was hosted by Brazil, and included teams from all 10 CONMEBOL members (Argentina, Bolivia, Brazil, Chile, Colombia, Ecuador, Paraguay, Peru, Uruguay and Venezuela). The Colombian team Atlético Huila won the championship game 5-3 in a penalty shootout against the Brazilian team Santos. CONMEBOL now requires that all clubs that enter the men's Copa Libertadores field competitive women's sides, a policy that took effect with the 2019 men's edition.

The only Latin American countries that have had women's tournaments for more than 20 years are Argentina, Uruguay and Brazil. Ecuador, Chile, Mexico and Colombia are relatively new to implementing professional women's football leagues, and it is still growing in El Salvador, Nicaragua, Costa Rica and Panama, who have had small semiprofessional championships.

Basketball
Professional women's basketball is slowly gaining more attention in South America. Many Latin American countries have professional women's leagues, but the only country to obtain success internationally is Brazil. The FIBA Women's Basketball World Cup is a world basketball tournament held every four years for women's basketball national teams. Since the tournament's creation in 1953, Brazil is the only South American team that has won a title. This championship was part of a golden era for women's basketball in Brazil in the 1990s and early 2000s, led by Hortencia Marcari and Maria Paula Gonçalves da Silva. In this era, Brazil also won silver and bronze, respectively, in the 1996 and 2000 Olympics.

In the 2018 FIBA Women's Basketball World Cup, Argentina and Puerto Rico were the only two Latin American teams to qualify. However, they placed last among the participating teams.

Rugby
Rugby in Latin America has grown exponentially ever since Rugby Sevens was added to the Olympics in 2016. The prominent tournament for women's rugby in Latin America is CONSUR Women's 7's. This tournament began in 2004 hosted by Venezuela, and is now a qualifier for several international tournaments such as the Pan American Games and the Olympic Games.

In the 2018 Rugby World Cup Sevens in San Francisco, the only two Latin American women's teams that qualified were Brazil and Mexico. Both teams lost in the Round of 16.

Tennis

There have been several successful Latin American professional women's tennis players.

Anita Lizana of Chile was the first Latin American to be ranked No. 1 in the world in women's singles, as well as the first Latin American, male or female, to win a Grand Slam title.

Brazilian player Maria Bueno saw success in singles and doubles play in the 1950s and 1960s, winning 19 Grand Slam titles across singles, doubles, and mixed doubles.

Mexican doubles pair Rosie Reyes Darmon and Yola Ramírez Ochoa won the 1958 French Open.

Fiorella Bonicelli of Uruguay, a doubles player, won the 1976 French Open with her French partner.

Gabriela Sabatini of Argentina has won a Grand Slam title as well as 27 singles championships and 14 doubles championships. She is also a 3-time semi-finalist in the Australian Open, 5-time in Wimbledon and 3-time in the U.S. Open. Argentinian doubles player Paola Suárez won 8 Grand Slam doubles titles in the 2000s. Fellow Argentinian doubles player Gisela Dulko won the 2011 Australian Open.

Currently, Spanish-Venezuelan singles player  Garbiñe Muguruza represents Spain; she has won the singles titles at the 2016 French Open and 2017 Wimbledon and was world number one for four weeks.

Volleyball
Volleyball is one of the most popular sports for women in Latin America, particularly in Peru. The Peruvian Women's National Team was very successful in the 1980s, winning a silver medal at the 1988 Olympics in South Korea. The team was led by Natalia Málaga, Gabriela Pérez del Solar, and especially Cecilia Tait, who is considered one of the greatest athletes in Peru's history. The top volleyball competition in Peru is Liga Nacional Superior de Vóleibol (LNSV). It features twelve women's teams and nine men's teams. Winners of the competition qualify for the South American Volleyball Club Championship. Today, however, many other Latin American countries have had more international success in the sport.

At the 2018 Women's World Championship in Japan, several Latin American teams competed, including Argentina, Mexico, Cuba, Trinidad & Tobago, Brazil, The Dominican Republic, and Puerto Rico. None of these teams made it past the second round.

Many Latin American countries are currently very competitive internationally in women's volleyball. Brazil is ranked #4 in the world, with the Dominican Republic at #10, Argentina at #11, Puerto Rico at #13, Mexico at #21, Cuba at #25, and Peru at #27.

Motorsports

Five women competed in Formula One: Maria Teresa de Filippis (1958-1959), Lella Lombardi (1974-1976), Divina Galica (1976 and 1978), Desiré Wilson (1980) and Giovanna Amati (1992), totaling 29 entries and 15 starts. Lombardi had a best result of sixth at the 1975 Spanish Grand Prix, where she was awarded half a World Championship point.

The Deutsche Tourenwagen Masters has had four women drivers: Katherine Legge, Susie Stoddart, Rahel Frey and Vanina Ickx. Stoddart scored two 7th race finishes and a 13th place in the standings in 2010. In the Deutsche Tourenwagen Meisterschaft, Ellen Lohr scored a win.

In sports car racing, Desiré Wilson also won two races of the World Sportscar Championship, and Odette Siko resulted fourth overall at the 1932 24 Hours of Le Mans.

In rallying, Michèle Mouton got four wins and nine podiums at the World Rally Championship, resulting runner-up in 1982. Meanwhile, Jutta Kleinschmidt won the 2001 Dakar Rally.

In off-road motorcycling, Laia Sanz scored twelve women's trial world championships and three X Games endurocross gold medals.

In 2019 the W Series an all female racing championship in which the drivers can progress to Formula 1, Formula 2 & Formula 3 as a full time or replacement driver. The series is free to enter but you must be picked by the series as one of the 18 best female drivers in the world. The series has 10 races at 8 tracks that do Formula 1 races. Races are 30 minutes long and 1 extra lap after the time limit expires. Follows typical Formula 1 rules.

Top earning sportswomen
For several years, Forbes magazine has published a list of the top 10 earning female athletes, supplementing a similar list of the top 100 earners among athletes regardless of sex or gender. The 2021 list was the first to be based on earnings during the named calendar year; previous lists were based on a fiscal year that ended on June 30 of the year of publication.

Forbes list: 2021

Forbes list: 2020

Gender inequality across sports

Gender coaching gaps
Globally, coaching positions across all sports face a gender gap. Men hold more coaching positions than women, regardless of the gender of the sport, although the gender of the team's head coach has been shown not to impact team or individual player performance. In American college basketball for women, women make up 43.4% of coaching positions at the NCAA Division I level as of 2018. At the NCAA Division I level for men, women do not hold any coaching positions. Through 2018 in the WNBA, men held 29 head coach positions and women held 27. In other countries, gender representation statistics in coaching are similar or even more male-dominated. For example, in Norway, women made up 14% of elite level coaching positions in 2018.

These representation gaps reflect traditional societal gender stereotypes. One explanation for this is the stereotypical association of sports with masculinity: in coaching, traditionally expected masculine attributes such as dominance, aggressiveness, and independence are considered to be more desirable in head coaches when compared with traditionally expected feminine attributes such as affection, sympathy, and timidity. As of 2018, outside of basketball, fewer than 5 percent of men's teams are coached by women, and they are primarily at smaller universities.

Gender wage gap

Coaches
Salaries are consistent between female and male coaches within individual sports programs. The coaching wage gap exists when comparing female sports programs with male programs. Coaches for women's programs are paid less than coaches for men's programs. This has frequently been rationalized by the fact that women's programs are not as financially successful, do not generate similar media coverage, and do not draw similar crowds as their male counterparts. In 2010 NCAA Division I basketball, the median salary for the head coach position in women's programs was $171,600 and the median salary for the head coach position for men was $329,000. In 2018, the median salary for women's programs was increased to $690,000 and for men's programs to $2.7 million. The gap between men's and women's NCAA Division I programs was particularly significant among the highest paid coaches. As of 2018, Mike Krzyzewski at Duke University was the highest earning coach for men's basketball. He earned $9.0 million and had won 5 national championships at that point. The highest-paid female coach in 2018 was Kim Mulkey of Baylor University at $1.85 million, who had won two national titles at that point; she would win a third the following season. At the same time, the highest-paid coach of a women's team was Geno Auriemma of the University of Connecticut, who had won 11 national championships, a record for any D-I basketball coach. He earned $2.4 million at the time. This overall pay disparity among men's and women's athletic programs exists across every sport and varies based on revenue and media coverage.

Coverage

It was not until the Civil Rights Act of 1964 and the passing of Title IX in 1972 that women were given the respect they deserved. The Civil Rights Act of 1964 prohibits discrimination on the basis of race, color, religion, sex or national origin. Provisions of this civil rights act forbade discrimination on the basis of sex as well as race in hiring, promoting, and firing. Although there has been great advancement of women's sports and female athletes, the potential for strong women to be positive role models and the  portrayal  of  these  athletes  in  the  media  has  been  subjected  to  objectification  and  invisibility  compared  to  male  athletes and male sports. Women's sports are, on average, underrepresented in comparison to male sports. Exclusion and dismissal of female athletes are common themes that are found during research of media representation. Sports media tends to represent women athletes as women first and athletes second. The media’s lack of coverage for women’s sports clearly reflects society’s view of women, in that they are less than their male counterparts, and that the cultural norm of society is that men are considered the strong, athletic ones who dominate the sports world.

One percent of network television coverage included women's athletics in 2014, and ESPN's SportsCenter featured women two percent of the time. Even when female sports are televised or receive media attention, the athletes are often objectified or their personal lives are brought into question. Coverage of women in sports is often dominated by references to appearance, age, or family life, whereas men are depicted as powerful, independent, dominating, and valued as athletes. Every day, men’s sports stories dominate the 10 most popular sports websites. Women’s sports in the U.S. receive only 4 percent of sports media coverage, according to the Tucker Center for Research on Girls & Women in Sports at the University of Minnesota. In a study of televised sports news, ongoing since 1989, three LA-based stations dedicated, on average, 3.2 percent of their sports coverage to women’s sports, according to the 2014 results.

Sports coverage is powerful in shaping norms and stereotypes about gender. Media has the ability to challenge these norms, promoting a balanced coverage of men’s and women’s sports and a fair portrayal of sportspeople – irrespective of gender. On International Women's Day in 2020, CBC announced its commitment to provide gender equal coverage on its original content. Chris Wilson, the executive director of CBC Sports and Olympics, said, "And we're going to make sure that when you look across our entire CBC sports ecosystem over the course of a year, that we're covering as much women's sport as we're covering men."

Cheryl Cooky, an associate professor of American studies and women’s, gender, and sexuality studies at Purdue University says, “The interest for women’s sports is there. It’s just a problem of how leagues and teams are marketed. We don’t see the same amount of coverage. We don’t see the same investment in women’s sports.” 

Record breaking growth has been documented in the early 2020s; with the National Women's Soccer League viewership having increased by 500%, the WNBA's by 68%, the 2021 Women’s College World Series best-of-three-game championship series had 1.84 million viewers which was more than a NHL playoff game the same day. Social media has further encouraged greater interest. Despite this as of 2019 95% of all sports TV coverage still focused on men's sports mainly but with stronger cultural biases limiting coverage is especially still noted in the NCAA & US soccer organizations.

Basketball
The National Collegiate Athletic Association has built its trademarked “March Madness” phrase into one of the most powerful brands in sports. It’s plastered on the courts, arenas and broadcasts for the lucrative NCAA men’s basketball tournament—and absent from the women’s tournament. The 2021 NCAA Basketball Championships were an eye opener for many viewers. The issues relating to gender inequality came to light when Stanford performance coach, Ali Kershner, posted side-by-side photos of the difference in weight rooms constructed for the female and male athletes, which later went viral on Twitter. Oregon player Sedona Prince also posted a TikTok video, exposing the disparities at the NCAA Women's Basketball Championships. Once brought to the attention of social media users, the issue was quickly handled by brands to ensure gender equality was met. To further express the gender inequality in the media at the tournament, the NCAA did not provide interview transcription services until the Women's Sweet 16, but provided these services for all post-game press conferences at the Men's Tournament. Although the NCAA was unable to tell news outlets how to cover the tournament, their website was male-dominated. A reader stated they "had to scroll past 26 stories or videos about the men’s basketball tournament before reaching the first story or video about the women’s tournament." On Twitter, the use of hashtags for the NCAA Tournament was far different for the women versus its male counterparts. The handle @MarchMadness, along with #MarchMadness is used specifically for the men's tournament only, while women's basketball content is found using @NCAAwbb and gendered hashtags including #ncaaW and #WFinalFour. Although the trademarked "March Madness" is allowed to be used for both men and women's basketball, the NCAA used it only for the men's tournament until 2022.

During the COVID-19 pandemic, there was a large increase in coverage for the National Women's Basketball Association (WNBA). There were nearly 90 nationally televised games, and viewership numbers were up, with a 68 per cent increase in regular season average viewership across all networks. The big increase in viewership was due in part to ESPN Network and CBS Television Network. The exposure to women's basketball was a step in the right direction, and social media interactions continue to grow, as there was a 30 per cent increase in cross-platform average action for social posts. In replacement of in-person viewership, the WNBA formed a "Tap to Cheer" application which resulted in an 85 per cent increase in average weekly mobile application downloads, totaling 109 million taps.

Ice Hockey
The National Women's Hockey League, since renamed the Premier Hockey Federation, saw history being made in the 2020-2021 season as both of the two Isobel Cup semifinals on March 26 and the final on March 27 were broadcast on NBCSN during the Saturday night prime time for Americans and streamed on Twitch for international viewers. For the first time in the sport’s history, every professional women’s hockey game in North America that year had either been broadcast on live television or had a sponsored, high-quality stream. In addition to the Twitch and NBCSN feeds for the NWHL, February 2021 saw Sportsnet, NBC, and CBC showing at least one of the Professional Women’s Hockey Players Association’s four games that season. Although exciting for the women's hockey game, it is hard to forget that only two years ago, the NWHL and PWHPA struggled to secure consistent airtime, and if they did, it was of poor quality and was not advertised appropriately.

Before this season, the Olympics was the only way fans were able to watch women's hockey when not in person. The 2018 Olympic gold medal game between Canada and the United States drew 3.7 million viewers to NBCSN and NBC streaming platforms. Some other championships and events, such as the 2020 Elite Women's 3-on-3 game at the NHL All-Star game, were aired on CBC and Sportsnet, and the Women's World Championships was broadcast on TSN for Canadian viewers. It was not until 2016 that these games were made available in the United States on the NHL Network.

It may seem like there were advancements made in the coverage of women’s hockey, but in 2019, it became apparent it was not that easy to watch women's hockey on your television. The Under-18 Women's World Championship in 2019 was moved to be in direct competition with the World Juniors for viewers and media attention. The Women's World Championship is the biggest international event in any non-Olympic year for women, so there was a lot of backlash faced after this decision. Not to mention, the broadcast set up for the 2019 Women's World Championship was a birds-eye view, similar to that of a doorbell camera, whereas the Men's World Junior Championship tournament was aired in its entirety on TSN, with expansive coverage, analysis, and multiple cameras. Many discussed the lack of forethought and care for how a simultaneously scheduled tournament performs in media attention.

Social media, and the help of the NHL player's association, have both been important factors in helping to promote women's hockey. In fact, recently, there was a one-minute video released in February 2021, titled "Stick In The Ground," that features U.S. and Canadian women's national team players, NHL players, tennis great Billie Jean King and even Toronto Mayor John Tory discussing the importance of planting a stick to benefit the future of women's hockey. Numerous NHL players participated in the Professional Women's Hockey Players' Association's campaign, promoting the need to establish a new North American women's league. Various NHL teams have partnered with the PWHPA, including the Toronto Maple Leafs, Chicago Blackhawks, St. Louis Blues, and the New York Rangers. These partnerships have and will continue to help with the visibility of women's hockey.

Tennis
Women's tennis does get a lot of viewership. The 2018 US Open Women’s singles final had 1.04 million more viewers than the Men’s final. Women’s Grand Slams received 41 per cent less media attention than men, despite similar viewership. In the only Grand Slam where women received more attention than men, this was due to media focus on controversy (marred by accusations of sexism and racism), rather than ability. During the 2018 U.S. Open Final between Serena Williams and Naomi Osaka, Williams was defeated by Osaka 6-2 and 6-4, but her accomplishment was overshadowed in the media by violations handed to Williams by umpire Carlos Ramos. After two code violations, Serena Williams told Carlos Ramos she "doesn’t cheat to win", and claimed he was attacking her character. Williams called Ramos a "thief" and said he had stolen a point from her. After a lengthy exchange with Ramos, which brought Tournament Referee Brian Earley out to the court, a finger-pointing and visibly upset Williams was given a third code violation for verbal abuse, this one costing her a game. Rather than promoting the historical win of Osaka, the media chose to portray Williams as an aggressive, out-of-line individual. There was a cartoon which depicted an overly large and muscular Williams with exaggerated features jumping up and down. Beneath her are a broken racquet and a pacifier, suggesting the athlete engaged in an infantile tantrum on the court. The 2018 U.S. Open headlines and TV coverage were all regarding Serena Williams.

The audience for the women’s final on July 14, 2018, in which Angelique Kerber defeated Serena Williams, peaked at 4.6 million, while the peak figure for Novak Djokovic’s victory over Kevin Anderson the next day, which clashed with the football World Cup final, was 4.5 million. During three of the Grand Slams, coverage spikes were significantly larger for men than women. As an example, during the month of Wimbledon (July 2018), the men’s single’s tournament was covered in 32,200 articles compared to 20,180 for the women’s. During the Australian Open, the women’s tournament saw 13,900 pieces, some 15,000 fewer than the men’s (28,130). Likewise, across May and June, the women’s French Open was covered by 7,500 pieces and the men’s by 13,300.

There is interest in women's tennis, but it will be important to focus articles on female tennis players as athletes and their abilities, rather than discussing outside factors such as family life or their actions during a game.

Soccer
There has been massive growth in media coverage of women's soccer in recent years. From 2013-2016, the National Women's Soccer league was streamed via YouTube or on the individual team's websites for free, with the exception of the Boston Breakers, who charged a small fee. In 2013, the league signed a one-year deal with Fox Sports 2 to televise multiple games during the season, and then in 2014, they signed another one-year deal with ESPN to allow regular season and playoff games to be live streamed on ESPN 2 and ESPN 3. As of 2017, the NWSL announced a three-year deal with A&E Networks, broadcasting 22 regular-season games and 3 playoff matches, which marked the first time the NWSL had a weekly broadcast for the duration of the season. Presently, the NWSL has a three-year agreement with CBS Sports and the Twitch streaming service to broadcast 87 matches split between CBS, CBS Sports Network, and CBS All Access in Canada and the United States. NBC also agreed to broadcast the Olympic tournament through 2032.

The 2015 Women's World Cup Final between the United States and Japan was the most viewed soccer match, between both men's or women's soccer, in American broadcast history. It averaged 23 million viewers and higher ratings than the NBA finals and the Stanley Cup finals. The final was also the most watched US-Spanish language broadcast of a FIFA Women's World Cup match in history. Overall, there were over 750 million viewers for the 2015 FIFA Women's World Cup, making it the most viewed Women's World Cup in history. The FIFA Women's World Cup is now the second-most watched FIFA tournament, with only the men's FIFA World Cup attracting more viewership. The 2019 FIFA Women’s World Cup generated record viewership (993 million people watched on TV, 482 million on digital platforms), and the final was more popular than the 2018 men’s final, with a 22% larger audience.

It was not until after the U.S. Women's Soccer Team won the World Cup series in 2015 that they decided to take a stand against gender inequality. “I realized that there’s not nearly enough media coverage for female athletes in relation to the amount of female athletes who participate in sports,” said U.S. Women's Soccer Team member, Alex Morgan. In March 2016, five members of the team joined in to file a wage-discrimination action against the U.S. Soccer Federation, and one year following the action, it was announced that a new collective bargaining agreement had been made. On March 8, 2019, all 28 members of the U.S. Women's Soccer Team filed a lawsuit against the U.S. Soccer Federation for gender discrimination under the Civil Rights Act of 1964, and on March 8, 2021, Congresswomen Doris Matsui and Rosa DeLauro introduced the Give Our Athletes Level Salaries (GOALS) Act to ensure the U.S. Women's Soccer Team members "are paid fair and equitable wages compared to the U.S. Men's team."

To allow for more female-focused media coverage, U.S. Women's Soccer star, Alex Morgan, has recently launched her own media venture focusing on storytelling, specifically content for girls created by female athletes. “Men’s sports are always in the spotlight. We’ll be focusing on women in sports and sharing the stories that I think a lot of people want hear, and girls need to be given access to.” This venture will allow female athletes to use their platform to enhance the viewership of women's sports across the globe.

Social media

With the strong advancements in social media, society is able to learn and grow from like-minded individuals through their platforms. There is a lack of media exposure for female athletes and female sports, and when there is, women are underrepresented or portrayed as being more masculine and out of character. Due to the lack of exposure, female athletes are forced to engage with fans and various brands in order to provide them with sponsorship opportunities. Many female athletes must be employed outside of their sports because their pay is not high enough to cover expenses like that of their male counterparts. This has limited the growth of women's sports. Social media offers female athletes an opportunity to amplify their voices and grow their presence. Female athletes are now often social media influencers, and some try to become role models for the younger generations. Ramla Ali, a Somali born female boxer and Nike sponsored athlete, uses her platform to share her struggles in a male-dominated sport and is sparking inspiration amongst others.

Social media will become a big growth factor in women's sports as it continues to advance. Social media is changing the way sports stars, clubs, and fans are interacting with each other. From live-tweeting games, creating snarky memes, and cheerleading from the webosphere, spectators are no longer simply watching sports, and fans can often get news, insights and commentary straight from the source. The voice as well as the face of sports is changing in response to social and digital media. Through the use of media, sporting clubs, teams, and organizations are able to release news and broadcast their own games, skipping over the use of traditional news media. If female athletes and women's sports organizations are able to market themselves, aside from needing a greater exposure on national television, they will be able to further use its social media platforms to their advantage.

Sex testing
Sex verification testing has been used to determine who is allowed to compete as a woman.  This is because males have a biological advantage over females in some physical activities, such as running. Feminists and women's rights advocates have pushed for equality and better management within sports.

South African runner Caster Semenya won the women's 800 meters race at the 2009 World Championships. Almost immediately after her win, the International Association of Athletics Federations, now known as World Athletics, ordered her to go through sex verification testing.  This information was leaked to the press.  The results were used to determine if Semenya was qualified to race as a woman, or if she had a "rare medical condition" that would give her an "unfair advantage".  The rules about hormone levels have changed several times, and most recently, WA has ordered that women with disorders of sex development that result in natural hyperandrogenism must take medication to reduce their testosterone levels to be eligible to compete. As of June 2019, Semenya is involved in a lawsuit to contest these rules.

Women's professional sports competitions

Women's sports at the Olympics

Badminton

BWF World Senior Championships

Cycling
UCI Women's Road World Cup

Football

International tournaments 
Women's World Cup
AFC Women's Asian Cup
Algarve Cup
SheBelieves Cup
Four Nations Tournament
CONCACAF W Championship
CONCACAF W Gold Cup
OFC Women's Championship
UEFA Women's Championship
CONMEBOL Sudamericano Femenino
Copa Libertadores Femenina
U-20 World Cup
U-17 World Cup

Domestic leagues 
 A-League Women (Australia)
 FA Women's Super League (England)
 Division 1 Féminine (France)
 Frauen-Bundesliga (Germany)
 WE League (Japan)
 Liga MX Femenil (Mexico)
 Primera División (Spain)
 National Women's Soccer League (USA)

Domestic cups 
Copa do Brasil de Futebol Feminino
FA Women's Cup (England)
FA Women's Premier League Cup (England)
FA Women's Community Shield (England)
NWSL Challenge Cup (USA)

Netball
 ANZ Championship — defunct; replaced by:
 ANZ Premiership in New Zealand
 Suncorp Super Netball in Australia
 Netball and the Olympic Movement

Ice hockey
Alpine Cup
Asian Winter Games
Clarkson Cup
Coupe Dodge
Elite Women's Hockey League
Esso women's hockey nationals
4 Nations Cup
MLP Nations Cup
NCAA Women's Frozen Four
IIHF Challenge Cup of Asia
IIHF European Women's Champions Cup
IIHF European Women Championships
IIHF World Women's Championships
IIHF World Women's U18 Championships
Premier Hockey Federation
Women's hockey Tournament at the Olympic Games
WickFest
1987 World Women's Hockey Tournament
Women's Pacific Rim Championship
Winter Universiade

Softball
Softball at the Olympics
Softball at the 1996 Summer Olympics
Softball at the 2000 Summer Olympics
Softball at the 2004 Summer Olympics
Softball at the 2008 Summer Olympics

Golf
The Ladies European Tour is Europe's leading women's professional golf tour and formed as the WPGA in 1978. Over the last 33 years, the tour has developed into a truly international organization and in 2011 operated 28 golf tournaments in 19 different countries worldwide.

Cricket

The ICC Women's world cup, ICC Women's T20 World cup and the Women's Asia Cup are the major women's cricket tournaments. Women's cricket was also included in the 2022 Commonwealth Games.

Tennis
Grand Slam

Active women's professional leagues and associations

See also

 Women's sports
 Professional sports
 Mixed-sex sports
 List of female sportspeople
 Major women's sport leagues in North America
 :Category:Sportswomen by sport
 :Category:Women's national sports teams
 Women's National Basketball Association (WNBA)
 National Women's Soccer League (NWSL), effective replacement of the following defunct leagues:
 Women's Professional Soccer (WPS)
 Women's United Soccer Association (WUSA)
 USL W-League (defunct)
 USL Super League (second-level; planned launch in 2023)
 United Women's Soccer
 National Pro Fastpitch (NPF)
 National Ringette League (NRL)
 Western Women's Hockey League (WWHL)
 Canadian Women's Hockey League (CWHL)
 Legends Football League

References

External links
 Meg Hewings, Women's pro league could help grow hockey in Hour.ca, September 16, 2010.
   Mike Beamish, Equality in sports? Women aren't there yet in Vancouver Sun March 7, 2011.
  John MacKinnon, Women remain under-represented in sports leadership roles in Times Colonist, March 8, 2011.
  Stephanie Myles, Women’s hockey in need of more promotion, sponsors in Calgary Herald, March 23, 2011.
 History of Women in Sports Timeline

Professional sports